Flight Paths is the second album by Australian rock band The Paradise Motel, their first album released after relocating from Melbourne to London.

Singles from the album included "Aeroplanes", "Derwent River Star" and "Drive", a cover of the Cars' hit, and the band's most popular song. Their version was featured on the soundtrack to the 2001 Richard Lowenstein film He Died with a Felafel in His Hand.

Flight Paths was followed by the album Reworkings featuring remixes of tracks from Flight Paths and the band's previous album Still Life by artists including Lee Ranaldo, Echoboy and Mark Eitzel.

Track listing

Personnel 
Mérida Sussex – vocals
Matt Bailey – bass
Matt Aulich – guitars
BJ Austin – organ, pedal steel
Tim O'Shannassy – drums
Charles Bickford – guitar, organ, percussion

Lyrics were written by Charles Bickford, string arrangements were composed by Matt Aulich, except 'Drive', written by Ric Ocasek.

Charts

References

The Paradise Motel albums
Infectious Records albums
Mushroom Records albums
1996 albums